The manta esperancera is a traditional shawl worn by farmers in Tenerife, Canary Islands, Spain.

The blanket is always beige. At the bottom It has a series of alternating stripes with beige background of blue hues.

History 
The manta esperancera originated in high, wet and wooded areas of the island of Tenerife. They were originally exported to England. Later they became used as men's field clothing.

Alternatively, the manta esperancera could be an evolution of the Tamarco, a winter garment that was worn by the Guanche autochthones of the Canary Islands. Over time, the manta esperancera has become a symbol of the traditional clothing of the Canary Islands. It is now traditional worn by several folk groups of the islands including Los Sabandeños and Los Gofiones.

References 

History of the Canary Islands
Canarian culture
Spanish clothing